Kanunnikov is a Russian surname that may refer to:

 Boris Kanunnikov, lead guitarist of Umka and Bronevik
 Maksim Kanunnikov (born 1991), Russian footballer
 Oleg Kanunnikov, radio operator killed in TransAVIAexport Airlines Il-76 crash in Mogadishu, 2007
 Pavel Kanunnikov (1898–1974), Soviet footballer

Russian-language surnames